Johan Roijakkers (born September 15, 1980) is a Dutch basketball coach, who is the head coach of the Saudi Arabia men's national team. He coached 8 years in the German EasyCredit BBL with BG Göttingen and Brose Bamberg and in Italy in the Lega Basket Serie A with Pallacanestro Varese. He also competed internationally in the Basketball Champions League. Roijakkers won 3 championships in 3 different countries and was national team coach for the Netherlands U18 4 years in a row.

Coaching career
As an assistant coach Roijakkers worked together with Chris Finch for five years in Belgium with Bree B.B.C and Dexia Mons-Hainaut. Together they reached 5 finals in 5 years and won the first national title in 2005 for Bree B.B.C. Roijakkers coached game 2 in the finals when coach Chris Finch was ejected after 2 technical fouls already in the 1st quarter. Bree B.B.C. won the game in overtime. During the 2006-07 season, Roijakkers competed with Bree B.B.C in the ULEB Cup. The ULEB Cup campaign included wins against Alba Berlin, Aris B.C., Lukoil Academic and BK Ventspils. In 2007, Roijakkers and Finch moved to Dexia Mons-Hainaut together, where they went to the finals of the FIBA Europe Cup in 2008. In 2010 they worked together once again in the NBA G League with the Rio Grande Valley Vipers and again they went to the finals of the NBA G League in 2011. When Finch signed in the NBA, Roijakkers started his head coach career in Europe.

His first head coaching job came in 2011 with BC Prievidza in Slovakia, where he won the national title in the Slovakian ExtraLiga his first year. It was exactly 17 years ago that BC Prievidza made it to the finals and 18 years since they won a national title. He was named Coach of the Year in Slovakia for the 2011-12 season by the Slovakian ExtraLiga and Eurobasket.com. Roijakkers was inducted into the BC Prievidza hall of fame.

In June 2012, Roijakkers signed for BG Göttingen in the German ProA. In the 2013-14 season, Roijakkers guided the team to promotion to Germany's first tier, EasyCredit BBL. BG Göttingen went undefeated during the 2013-14 season at home (21-0). In the finals they beat Crailsheim Merlins to capture the ProA championship title. In his first year as Bundesliga head coach, Roijakkers came in second in the Coach of the Year vote behind Saša Obradović. In his final season with  BG Göttingen, he coached the team to the play offs, reaching the final 8 at the bubble in Munich.

On July 1, 2020, Roijakkers signed a three-year contract as the head coach of Brose Bamberg who competed in the German BBL and the Basketball Champions League. Brose Bamberg did not loose a single game in Basketball Champions League at home in the 20-21 season. Roijakkers was released of his duties in November 2021 after the team lost 3 games in a row. Roijakkers coached a total of 253 games in the EasyCredit BBL and 13 games in the Basketball Champions League.

On January 12, 2022, he replaced Adriano Vertemati as the head coach of Pallacanestro Varese in the Italian Lega Basket Serie A. Roijakkers was the only foreign coach in the Lega Basket Serie A. Before Roijakkers joined the team in January 2022, the team had won a total of three games. He guided the team to seven wins out of the first eight games. He managed to move Varese from last to tenth place in the Serie A standings. Roijakkers changed the face of the team, relying on young Italian players. On April 14, 2022, Pallacanestro Varese announced to have released Roijakkers for actions "not in line with the club's values". The case was sent to the conciliation and arbitration board of the league. On July 4, 2022, it was announced that an amicably settlement has been found between both parties. The settlement included the club revoking Roijakkers' dismissal and a termination of the contract by mutual consent.

On June 14, 2022, he was announced as the new coach of Belgium 2de Landelijke side Bree B.B.C, returning to old stomping grounds. He left Bree in October 2022 to assume the head coaching reins of the Saudi Arabia men's national team, representing the Kingdom of Saudi Arabia. On October 13, 2022, Roijakkers signed a one-year contract with the Saudi Basketball Federation. The Saudi Arabia men's national team is competing in the Asian Qualifiers for the 2023 FIBA Basketball World Cup.

Career highlights and awards

As coach

 2022 Brought Pallacanestro Varese from last place to 10th place
 2020 & 2021 German BBL Playoffs
 2015 German BBL Runner Up Coach of the Year
 2014 German Pro A Champion
 2012 Slovakian Champion
 2012 Slovakian Coach of the Year
 2011 NBA G-League Finalist
 2009 Belgian League Finalist
 2008 FIBA EuroCup Finalist
 2008 Belgian Cup Finalist
 2007 Belgian League Finalist
 2006 Belgian Super Cup Winner
 2005 Belgian League Champion

References

1980 births

Living people
BC Prievidza coaches
BG Göttingen coaches
Brose Baskets coaches
Bree BBC players
Dutch basketball coaches
Dutch expatriate basketball people in Belgium
Dutch men's basketball players
People from Deurne, Netherlands
Pallacanestro Varese coaches
Sportspeople from North Brabant
Dutch expatriate basketball people in Germany
Dutch expatriate basketball people in Slovakia
Dutch expatriate basketball people in Italy